The Boston Society of Film Critics (BSFC) is an organization of film reviewers from Boston, Massachusetts in the United States.

History
The BSFC was formed in 1981 to make “Boston’s unique critical perspective heard on a national and international level by awarding commendations to the best of the year’s films and filmmakers and local film theaters and film societies that offer outstanding film programming.”

Every year for the past three decades, the Boston Society of Film Critics give their Boston Society of Film Critics Awards. The 2009 award for best picture and best director went to The Hurt Locker directed by Kathryn Bigelow and also won three other awards (best actor, best cinematography and best film editing). It was the first time in the organization's thirty-year history that one film took home five awards.

The New Filmmaker award is named for David Brudnoy, Boston-area radio talk show host and film critic, who was a founding member of the BSFC; he died in 2004. Winners include Joe Wright (Pride and Prejudice), Ryan Fleck (Half Nelson) and Florian Zeller (The Father).

Categories
 Best Actor
 Best Actress
 Best Cast
 Best Cinematography
 Best Director
 Best Editing
 Best Film
 Best Foreign Language Film
 Best New Filmmaker
 Best Screenplay
 Best Supporting Actor
 Best Supporting Actress
 Best Use of Music in a Film
 Best Animated Film

Notes
: The Society does not distinguish between original screenplays and adaptation for their Best Screenplay award.

References

External links
 Boston Society of Film Critics official website
 Boston Society of Film Critics Awards at the Internet Movie Database
 Boston Society of Film Critics Awards at Indiepix

 
American film critics associations
Culture of Boston
Cinema of Massachusetts
Mass media in Boston
Organizations based in Boston